John Albert Booth (born 29 July 1942) is a former Australian rules footballer who played with Essendon and Fitzroy in the Victorian Football League (VFL). He later played with Port Melbourne and Brunswick in the Victorian Football Association (VFA).

Notes

External links 

John Booth's playing statistics from The VFA Project

Living people
1942 births
Australian rules footballers from Victoria (Australia)
Essendon Football Club players
Fitzroy Football Club players
Doutta Stars Football Club players
Port Melbourne Football Club players
Brunswick Football Club players